Qanat-e Now (also Romanized as Qanāt-e Now and Qanāt-i-Nau) is a village in Shahidabad Rural District, Mashhad-e Morghab District, Khorrambid County, Fars Province, Iran. At the 2006 census, its population was 169, in 48 families.

References 

Populated places in Khorrambid County